Louis "El Maravilloso" Loizides is one of the founders of the bachata movement in the Dominican Republic. Several of the island's most popular bachata musicians, such as Luis Vargas and Antony Santos, have labeled Louis the father of Bachata music.

Loizides has been a strong proponent of the "Power Bachata" movement, which uses a combination of the electric guitar and harpsichord. This movement never caught on, and as a result Loizides slipped from notoriety and has since retired. But many think he will make a comeback and he has started to tour several venues in the United States.

Beginnings

Unlike most bachata singers, Loizides was born in Cuba. He built a raft to escape Castro's regime in the early 1960s. Originally he intended to travel towards Miami, but he had a passion for Dominican culture and set sail for the Dominican Republic. There is some dispute about this. Several sources believe that Loizides did not sail in the right direction and went towards the Dominican Republic by mistake. He settled in Puerto Plata in 1965. He worked in a local bar/brothel and learned to play the guitar for its customers in order to earn tips. While the earliest bachata recording is usually attributed to José Manuel Calderón in 1961, Loizides is considered by many to be the influential founder of the bachata movement.

Legacy

Loizides is credited with the invention of several new bachata dancing patterns including the turn-style dip and cross-front return. These patterns are traditionally used on his birthday, March 11, by many notable bachateros.

In 2013 several rumors of Loizides' death circulated throughout the Bachata community in the Dominican Republic, but none of these rumors have had much credibility.

External links
Bachata Music History

Discography

1975: Grande y Beautifl
Track list:
 Parte Trasera
 Cerveza
 Spandex y Zapatos
 La Escalera a La Cabina del DJ
 Pasiones
 Los Cubanos y El Dominicano
 Mi Pequeña Balsa

1985: Bragas Gato (unreleased concept album)
Track list:
 Melón Dulce
 Guitarras y Claves

1986: Cintas Rojas
Track list:
 Tomates
 Me Encanta el Accordeón
 Gigantes de la Biblia
 Letras no Tienen Ningún Significado
 El Amor Físico
 La Vena en Su Teta
 El Muñeco
 Tu madre
 De Ti Me Separo
 Much Love

References 

Living people
Cuban musicians
Year of birth missing (living people)
Place of birth missing (living people)